Great Quittacas Pond is a lake, reservoir, or pond within the towns of Lakeville, Middleboro, and Rochester, in southeastern Massachusetts. It shares its waters with Pocksha Pond and possibly nearby Little Quittacas Pond. These lakes provide a source of drinking water to the city of New Bedford, the largest city in southeastern Massachusetts.

External links
Environmental Protection Agency

Taunton River watershed
Lakes of Plymouth County, Massachusetts
Lakeville, Massachusetts
Middleborough, Massachusetts
Rochester, Massachusetts
Reservoirs in Massachusetts